New Palestine (pronounced PAL-es-tēn) is a town in Sugar Creek Township, Hancock County, Indiana, along Sugar Creek. The population was 2,055 at the 2010 census.

History
New Palestine was laid out October 1, 1838, by Jonathan Evans. It first consisted of fifteen blocks and thirty six lots. A petition for the incorporation of New Palestine as a town was dated May 22, 1871, and presented to the board of county commissioners at the June session of 1871. At the time of the petition, New Palestine had a population of around 669 people. The vote for incorporation was held on June 24, 1871. Many years after incorporation, the town had difficulty with its name. The post office was known as Sugar Creek, the railroad and express stations as Palestine and the name of the town itself was New Palestine. Through the efforts of E.F. Faut and Congressman Bynum, the name of the post office was changed from Sugar Creek to New Palestine on January 16, 1889, and the name of the railroad station and express office were also changed to New Palestine.

Geography

Demographics

2010 census
As of the census of 2010, there were 2,055 people, 779 households, and 587 families living in the town. The racial makeup of the town was 97.8% White, 0.2% Native American, 0.6% Asian, 0.1% from other races, and 1.2% from two or more races. Hispanic or Latino of any race were 1.0% of the population.

There were 779 households, of which 41.7% had children under the age of 18 living with them, 59.2% were married couples living together, 11.9% had a female householder with no husband present, 4.2% had a male householder with no wife present, and 24.6% were non-families. 20.4% of all households were made up of individuals, and 8.7% had someone living alone who was 65 years of age or older. The average household size was 2.64 and the average family size was 3.04.

The median age in the town was 37.2 years. 28.9% of residents were under the age of 18; 6.9% were between the ages of 18 and 24; 26.2% were from 25 to 44; 25.4% were from 45 to 64; and 12.5% were 65 years of age or older. The gender makeup of the town was 49.8% male and 50.2% female.

2000 census
As of the 2000 census, there were 1,264 people, 469 households, and 364 families living in the town. The racial makeup of the town was 98.66% White, 0.08% African American, 0.24% Native American, 0.16% Asian, 0.16% from other races, and 0.71% from two or more races. Hispanic or Latino of any race were 0.32% of the population.

There were 469 households, out of which 42.6% had children under the age of 18 living with them, 67.0% were married couples living together, 7.7% had a female householder with no husband present, and 22.2% were non-families. 20.7% of all households were made up of individuals, and 7.7% had someone living alone who was 65 years of age or older. The average household size was 2.70 and the average family size was 3.10.

In the town, the population was spread out, with 30.5% under the age of 18, 4.4% from 18 to 24, 35.4% from 25 to 44, 18.7% from 45 to 64, and 11.1% who were 65 years of age or older. The median age was 36 years. For every 100 females, there were 96.9 males. For every 100 females age 18 and over, there were 93.0 males.

The median income for a household in the town was $61,875, and the median income for a family was $71,667. Males had a median income of $50,156 versus $31,538 for females. The per capita income for the town was $27,821. About 1.7% of families and 2.6% of the population were below the poverty line, including 1.0% of those under age 18 and 9.3% of those age 65 or over.

Arts and culture
New Palestine has a public library, a branch of the Hancock County Public Library.

Education
New Palestine is home to the Community School Corporation of Southern Hancock County, which includes three elementary schools (New Palestine, Sugar Creek, and Brandywine), one junior high school (New Palestine Junior High), one intermediate school (New Palestine Intermediate) and one high school (also referred to as New Palestine High School).

There are currently 3,206 students enrolled in the entire district. It is adjacent to Warren and Franklin township to its west and Shelby County to its south.

New Palestine High School is arguably the central hub of the town. Countless events occur year-round in the area, the most attended including football and basketball games, the beginning of the annual New Palestine Parade, and the annual Fall festival at the Lion's Club.

Notable people
 Todd Yoder, former American football tight end and Super Bowl XXXVII Champion
 Matt Canada, current Offensive Coordinator for the Pittsburgh Steelers
 Angela Ahrendts, former American CEO of Burberry and former Senior Vice President, Retail, Apple Inc.

Notes

External links
Community School Corporation of Southern Hancock County
New Palestine Area Chamber of Commerce

Towns in Hancock County, Indiana
Towns in Indiana
Indianapolis metropolitan area
Populated places established in 1838
1838 establishments in Indiana